Hrach Mikayeli Bartikyan (also transliterated as Hratch Bart'ikyan; July 7, 1927–August 17, 2011) was an Armenian academician and specialist on Byzantine and Armenian studies. The author of over 200 books, articles and monographs, he was a full member of the Armenian Academy of Sciences and headed its Medieval Studies department. He was also a member of several academic institutions, including the Greek Academy of Sciences, the Tiberian Academy of Rome, the Byzantine Studies Association of Greece, and is an honorary member of the Greek Civilization Establishment.

Life

Education
Born in Athens, Greece, Bartikyan received his education at a Greek gymnasium and graduated from there in 1945. A year later, his family repatriated to the Soviet Republic of Armenia. He applied and was granted admission to Yerevan State University. Bartikyan received his degree in history in 1953 and subsequently found work at the Institute of History at the Armenian Academy of Sciences. In 1972, he received his Doktor nauk.

Career 
Bartikyan's studies have tended to focus on the social movements and political and cultural relations between Armenians and the Byzantine Empire during the Middle Ages. A number of his articles have centered on the Paulician and Tondrakian heretical sects and on the level of Armenian influence found in the Byzantine epic poem, Digenis Acritas). In the 1960s, he initiated a translation project which aimed to translate important medieval Byzantine sources that related information about Armenia and Armenians (known under the entire series name of Otar Aghbyurnere Hayastani yev hayeri masin, Օտար աղբյուրները Հայաստանի և հայերի մասին) into Armenian. From 1967 onwards, Bartikyan translated and wrote the introductions of select parts of Procopius's (The Wars of Justinian, 1967; The Secret History, 1987), Constantine VII Porphyrogenitus's (De Administrando Imperio, 1970), John Scylitzes's (Synopsis of Histories, 1979) and Theophanes the Confessor's (Chronicle, 1984) histories. Bartikyan also translated the twelfth century chronicle of the Armenian chronicler Matthew of Edessa from classical to modern Eastern Armenian.

In addition to being the author of several articles and chapters in the eight-volume work History of the Armenian People (1970-1984), he wrote numerous entries on notable Byzantine and late medieval Armenian political and military figures, events, regions and cities in the 12-volume Armenian Soviet Encyclopedia (1974-1986).

Along with fellow Soviet Byzantine scholars such as Alexander Kazhdan, Bartikyan regularly attended and delivered papers at the International Byzantine Congresses. In April 2005, Bartikyan was awarded the Armenian President's Prize, which is "granted to successful candidates of art, culture and science," in the category of humanities.

Selected publications
 Источники для изучения истории павликианского движения. Yerevan, Armenian SSR: Armenian Academy of Sciences, 1961.
 "Замeтки o Византийскoм эпoce o Дигeнce Aкpитe." Византийский временник, т. 25, 1964.
 "La généalogie du Magistros Bagarat, Catépan de l'Orient, et des Kékauménos." Revue des Études Arméniennes. N.S. 2, 1965.
 "L'enoikion à Byzance et dans la capitale des Bagratides, Ani, à l'époque de la domination byzantine (1045-1064)." Revue des Études Arméniennes. N.S. 6, 1969.
 "Հայաստանի նվաճումը Բյուզանդական կայսրության կողմից" ("The Byzantine Conquest of Armenia"). Patma-Banasirakan Handes. № 2 (49), 1970.
 Hellenismos kai Armenia. Athens: Hidryma Goulandre-Chorn, 1991.
"Armenia and Armenians in the Byzantine Epic," in Digenes Akrites: New Approaches to Byzantine Heroic Poetry (Centre for Hellenic Studies, King's College London). David Ricks (ed.) Brookfield, Vt.: Variorum, 1993 .
 Պարթենիոս Աթենացու Պաղեստինի Կեսարիայի մետրոպոլիտի պատմություն հունաց և հայոց տարաձայնության (The History of the Controversy between Greeks and Armenians written by Parthenios of Athens, the Metropolitan of Caesarea of Palestine). Yerevan: Yerevan State University Press, 2005.

Notes

External links
Personal Data of Hrach Bartikyan on the AAS Website

Soviet historians
20th-century Armenian historians
Greek people of Armenian descent
Armenian Byzantinists
Armenian academics
1927 births
2011 deaths
Writers from Athens
Scholars of Byzantine history
Yerevan State University alumni